"See-Through" is the fourth episode of the second season and sixteenth overall episode of the American television drama series Dexter, which first aired on 21 October 2007 on Showtime in the United States. The episode was written by Scott Buck and was directed by Nick Gomez.

Plot

Dexter begins to question Lila's suitability as his sponsor, and Rita encourages him to find a male one. Rita's visiting mother, Gail (JoBeth Williams), becomes sure that Dexter is hiding something from the family. Cody starts having nightmares about the Bay Harbor Butcher. When Vince announces that he has found a way to identify the marina where the Bay Harbor Butcher moors his boat, Dexter attempts to destroy some of the evidence. Debra starts dating Gabriel (Dave Baez), whom she met at the gym. LaGuerta returns to her job as lieutenant following the mental collapse of Pascal, who suspects her fiancé of cheating; it turns out that he was cheating on her with none other than LaGuerta.

Production
Filming locations for the episode included Miami, Florida, as well as Long Beach, California.

Reception

The episode was positively received. IGN's Eric Goldman gave the episode a rating of 8.6 out of 10, and commented that "[t]his was a strong episode for a lot of characters". The A.V. Club critic Scott Tobias gave the episode a B+ grade and stated that "[a]fter the impressive character work in last week’s episode, "See-Through" downshifts into more of a storyline-juggler, dividing its time more equally to other characters and subplots that have taken a backseat and dealing with revelations in the BHB investigation."

References

External links

 
 "See-Through" at Showtime's website

2007 American television episodes
Dexter (TV series) episodes